Jefferson Cheng is a Filipino businessman and football administrator. He is the current manager of the Philippines women's national football team.

Education
Cheng attended Xavier School where he used to play competitive football as a leftback. He also studied at the University of the Philippines where he graduated with a degree in architecture.

Career

Club football
Cheng owns Davao Aguilas F.C., a club which used to play in the Philippines Football League, and currently in the 7's Football League. He is also the co-owner of A-League club Western Sydney Wanderers.

Philippine women national team

Cheng has also been a sponsor of the Philippines women's national football team since 2017. He was appointed the team manager of the team in 2017. He has been also a co-chair of the Philippine Football Federation Women's Committee. As team manager, he oversaw the national team in the 2022 AFC Women's Asian Cup qualifiers, as well as the tournament proper held in India. His connections in Australia, led to the hiring of Alen Stajcic as head coach for Philippines' stint in the Asian Cup. Under Stajcic and Cheng, the Philippines ended its campaign as semifinalists and qualified for the 2023 FIFA Women's World Cup – their first ever World Cup.

Philippine youth national teams
Cheng has also been a sponsor of the Philippine youth national team system; from the under-19 to the under-23 team.

Other ventures
Cheng serves as the director of Sabre Sports United and president of Philippine Airport Ground Support Solutions. He has been the director of the International Goalkeeping Academy of Jimmy Fraser.

He also sponsors local youth tournaments in Davao through his company Speed Regalo.

Personal life
Jefferson Cheng has a son named Enzo who has been a member of the Philippines national under-19 and under-22 national teams.

References

Living people
Year of birth missing (living people)
Filipino people of Chinese descent
Filipino football chairmen and investors
University of the Philippines alumni